The Fellhorn is a mountain in the "Allgäu Alps" near Oberstdorf, Germany, on the border with Austria. It is known for its fields of alpenroses (Rhododendron ferrugineum).

Access 
In 1972, a gondola lift, the "Fellhorn Lift", was built that runs up the mountain from the Stillach valley. Its top station is at 1,967 metres. There is also a lift connection to the Kanzelwandbahn. The cross-border Fellhorn/Kanzelwand Ski Region has 24 kilometres of slopes and 14 lifts.

Gallery

References

External links 

 The Fellhorn

Mountains of Bavaria
Mountains of Vorarlberg
Austria–Germany border
International mountains of Europe
Mountains of the Alps
Allgäu Alps